The Tenaga Nasional Berhad Hockey Club is a hockey club based in Kuala Lumpur, Malaysia. They are playing in top tier of the Malaysia Hockey League (MHL). The new home for this club is Tun Abdul Razak Stadium, Kuala Lumpur, Malaysia.

Tenaga Nasional Berhad is considered to be the most successful club in Malaysia Hockey League, they won the league five times in 1990, 1991–1992 (as Kilat Club), 2000–2001, 2002 & 2003 (as TNB HC). The team is coached by Lailin Abu Hassan.

History
 1987-1992: Kilat Club
 1992–present: Tenaga Nasional Berhad Hockey Club

Players

Current squad

Honours

Malaysia Hockey League
  League
 Winners (5): 1990, 1991–92, 2000–01, 2002, 2003

See also
 Malaysia Hockey League

References

Field hockey clubs established in 1987
1987 establishments in Malaysia
Malaysian field hockey clubs
Tenaga Nasional